Southwest Museum station is an at-grade light rail station on the L Line of the Los Angeles Metro Rail system. It is located near the intersection of Marmion Way at Museum Drive in the Mount Washington neighborhood of Los Angeles. The station opened on July 26, 2003, as part of the original Gold Line, then known as the "Pasadena Metro Blue Line" project.

The station is named after the nearby historic Southwest Museum which is located a short walk up from the station on Museum Drive and also features an enhanced architectural design, called Highland Park Gateway, created by artists Teddy Sandoval and Paul Polubinskas.

This station and all the other original and Foothill Extension stations will be part of the A Line upon completion of the Regional Connector project in 2023.

Service

Station layout

Hours and frequency

Connections 
, the following connections are available:
Los Angeles Metro Bus: ,

Nearby Landmarks 
 Southwest Museum of the American Indian (built 1914) — museum, library, and archive, Autry National Center property.
 Audubon Center in Ernest E. Debs Regional Park, east side of Arroyo Seco Parkway in the San Rafael Hills.
 Carlin G. Smith Recreation Center  —  West Avenue 46 off Figueroa Street.
 Casa de Adobe Museum (built 1916) — on North Figueroa Street, California Historical Landmark, Autry National Center property (closed) 
 Lummis House (built 1897–1907) — West Avenues 42 & 43 at Arroyo Seco Parkway, historic house museum and gardens.
 Ramona Hall Community Center — 4580 Figueroa Street.
 Sycamore Grove Park — along Figueroa Street & the Arroyo Seco and Arroyo Seco Parkway.

References 

L Line (Los Angeles Metro) stations
Mount Washington, Los Angeles
Arroyo Seco (Los Angeles County)
Northeast Los Angeles
Railway stations in the United States opened in 2003
2003 establishments in California